Prince Intawaroros Suriyawong (18591910) was the 35th and penultimate King of Lanna and 8th Ruler of Chiang Mai, reigning 1897–1910. He succeeded upon the death of Inthawichayanon. His successor became Chao Kaew Nawarat.

Royal decorations
 1889 –  Commander (Third Class) of The Most Noble Order of the Crown of Thailand
 1901 –  Knight Grand Commander (Second Class, higher grade) of the Most Illustrious Order of Chula Chom Klao

References

External links
The painting of the king: (bottom row, second from right) 

|-

1859 births
1910 deaths
Rulers of Chiang Mai
Chet Ton dynasty
Knights Grand Commander of the Order of Chula Chom Klao
20th-century Thai monarchs